"Livin' for Love" is a 2000 single from the album Natalie Cole: Greatest Hits, Vol. 1, and was written by Natalie Cole, Garianno Lorenzo and Denise Rich.  Livin' for Love was also the title of a 2000, TV film, based on Natalie Cole's life.  The single was Natalie Cole's second number one on the US dance charts after her hit cover of "Pink Cadillac" from her album Everlasting (1987); additionally, it was the first time in ten years that she placed a single on the dance charts after her contribution to the Pretty Woman soundtrack, "Wild Women Do", peaked at number eight in 1990.

Remixes
"Livin for Love" did not place on any other charts, but several remixes were released:
 Livin' For Love (Hex HQ2 Club Mix) Producer [Additional] – Mack Quayle*Remix – HQ2Remix [Credited To] – Hex Hector-8:55
 Livin' For Love (Acapella)-4:37
 Livin' For Love (Frankie Knuckles Classic Club Mix)-Remix, Producer [Additional] – Frankie Knuckles-8:11
 Livin' For Love (Hex HQ2 Instrumental), Producer [Additional] – Mack Quayle. Remix – HQ2  Remix [Credited To] – Hex Hector-4:14
 Livin' For Love (Hex HQ2 Radio Mix),Producer [Additional] – Mack Quayle. Remix – HQ2 Remix [Credited To] – Hex Hector-4:15
 Livin' For Love (Frankie Knuckles Classic Instrumental)-Remix, Producer [Additional] – Frankie Knuckles-6:53
 Livin' For Love (Frankie Knuckles Dubbin' 4 Love)-Remix, Producer [Additional] – Frankie Knuckles-7:09

See also
 List of number-one dance singles of 2000 (U.S.)

References

2000 singles
Natalie Cole songs
Songs written by Denise Eisenberg Rich
2000 songs